Stenidea lorenzoi is a species of beetle in the family Cerambycidae. It was described by García in 2002. It is known from the Canary Islands.

References

lorenzoi
Beetles described in 2002